Hans Falk (1918–2002) was a Swiss painter, who lived in New York City, Ireland, England, Switzerland and Stromboli, Italy. Hans Falk was one of the most important modern Swiss painters.

Hans Falk was born in Zurich in 1918 and went on to study at the Kunstgewerbeschule Zürich and the art schools in Lucerne. His first commissioned works were posters and graphic designs, which won him numerous awards. Amongst his most important competition wins were a series of seven posters he designed for the 1964 Swiss National Exhibition. He went on to travel extensively, living abroad for extended periods in England, New York and Ireland. In his later years he divided his home between Switzerland and the Sicilian island of Stromboli. He died in 2002, after a fruitful career that produced a large body of paintings, posters and sought-after graphic designs, and made him one of the most important contemporary Swiss artists.

Reference & External links
 Hans Falk - official Website
 Hans Falk - Painting the Light (tv documentary)

 

20th-century Swiss painters
Swiss male painters
Swiss poster artists
Swiss graphic designers
1918 births
2002 deaths
Zurich University of the Arts alumni
20th-century Swiss male artists